is a Japanese sprinter. She competed for the Japanese team in the 4 × 100 metres relay at the 2012 Summer Olympics; the team placed 15th with a time of 44.25 in Round 1 and did not qualify for the final.

Personal bests

Records
100 metres
Current Japanese junior and high school and youth record holder - 11.43 s (wind: +1.8 m/s) (Kumagaya, 13 May 2012)
Current Japanese junior high school record holder - 11.61 s (wind: +0.8 m/s) (Tottori, 23 August 2010)
200 metres
Former Japanese youth record holder - 23.83 s (wind: +0.9 m/s) (Kumagaya, 14 May 2012)
4 × 100 m relay
Former Japanese high school record holder - 45.23 s (relay leg: 4th) (Oita, 30 July 2013)
Former Japanese youth record holder - 46.05 s (relay leg: 4th) (Kofu, 27 October 2012)
Current Japanese junior high school record holder - 47.30 s (relay leg: 4th) (Oita, 24 August 2009)
60 metres (Indoor)
Former Japanese and Japanese junior record holder - 7.40 s (Osaka, 4 February 2012)

Competition record

National Championship

References

External links
 
 JAAF profile 
 

1995 births
Living people
People from Kiyose, Tokyo
Sportspeople from Tokyo Metropolis
Japanese female sprinters
Olympic athletes of Japan
Athletes (track and field) at the 2012 Summer Olympics
Competitors at the 2015 Summer Universiade
Athletes from Tokyo
Olympic female sprinters
20th-century Japanese women
21st-century Japanese women